Rohit Bansal is an Indian entrepreneur, co-founder and COO of e-commerce company Snapdeal.

Early life
Bansal was born in Malout, Punjab India.  He completed his school education at Delhi Public School (DPS) New Delhi and got his bachelor's degree in engineering from Indian Institute of Technology New Delhi.

Snapdeal
Bansal cofounded Snapdeal along with his school friend Kunal Bahl on February 4, 2010. In February 2020, Snapdeal invested in a startup Sanfe that deals in female hygiene products. It also invested in Ola, Bira, Razorpay, Beardo.

Awards and recognitions
 BMA Entrepreneur of the Year 2014 
 ET Top 50 Entrepreneur of India 2014
 EY Entrepreneur of the year - Startup 2014

Family 
His father was a grain merchant and mother a homemaker. Bansal is married to Parul, who is an architect. He also has two children.

References

Living people
Businesspeople from Delhi
People from New Delhi
Year of birth missing (living people)
IIT Delhi alumni